Seafield is a southern district of Ayr, Scotland. A major landmark in the area is the former Seafield Children's Hospital, which closed in 1991. The area is also home to a large golf course.

References

External links 
 About Ayr - About Ayr, South Ayrshire Council website information about Ayr
 South Ayrshire Council - South Ayrshire Council's website contains comprehensive information about the services provided by the Council

Areas of Ayr